Indocalamus tessellatus, the large-leaved bamboo, is a species of flowering plant in the grass family Poaceae, native to China. Given the best conditions possible, it will eventually form large thickets or groves, but can be kept in a large container. In cultivation in the UK it has gained the Royal Horticultural Society's Award of Garden Merit.

References

Bambusoideae